William Gurstelle (born March 29, 1956) is an American nonfiction author, magazine writer, and inventor. He is  a feature columnist for Make magazine and a columnist and contributing editor at Popular Science magazine. Previously, he was the Pyrotechnics and Ballistics Editor at Popular Mechanics magazine.

He is also the author of several science “how-to” books published by Crown Books/Random House and Chicago Review Press.

His best known work is Backyard Ballistics, which according to Newsweek magazine, has sold hundreds of thousands of copies. Other popular titles are Absinthe and Flamethrowers, and The Art of the Catapult. In 2011, Publishers Weekly stated Gurstelle had sold more than 300,000 of his books.

According to James A. Buczynski in Library Journal, Gurstelle's writing "balances scientific explanations of the technologies with profiles of the people who [explore] them."

Selected bibliography

References

External links
 New York Times Book Review – Absinthe and Flamethrowers
 Mythbuster's Adam Savage on The Practical Pyromaniac – Wall Street Journal
 A call to invention: DIY speaker edition - William Gurstelle – TED-Ed at TEDYouth 2012

1956 births
Living people
American engineering writers
American science writers
Writers from Saint Paul, Minnesota
American mechanical engineers